Gensi Township is a township under the administration of Taixing, Jiangsu, China. , it has ten villages under its administration:
Gensi Village
Laoye Village
Jugu Village
Nanhu Village
Jingdi Village
Lixiuhe Village
Shuanggang Village
Shuanglian Village
Xingang Village
Xingxu Village

References 

Township-level divisions of Jiangsu
Taixing